The 1988–89 NBA season was the Seattle SuperSonics' 22nd season in the National Basketball Association. During the off-season, the Sonics acquired Michael Cage from the Los Angeles Clippers. The SuperSonics won their first three games of the season, and held a 28–18 record at the All-Star break. However, the team lost seven straight games between March and April, but then posted an 8-game winning streak afterwards, and finished third in the Pacific Division with a 47–35 record. 

Dale Ellis averaged 27.5 points and 1.3 steals per game, finished second in the league with 162 three-point field goals, and was named to the All-NBA Third Team, and selected for the 1989 NBA All-Star Game, while Xavier McDaniel played a sixth man role, averaging 20.5 points and 5.3 rebounds per game off the bench, and finished in fifth place in Sixth Man of the Year voting, and second-year forward Derrick McKey became the team's starting small forward, averaging 15.9 points, 5.7 rebounds and 1.3 steals per game. In addition, Cage provided the team with 10.3 points and 9.6 rebounds per game, while Sedale Threatt contributed 8.6 points and 3.8 assists per game off the bench, Nate McMillan contributed 7.1 points, 5.2 rebounds, 9.3 assists and 2.1 steals per game, and Alton Lister provided with 8.0 points, 6.6 rebounds and 2.2 blocks per game. Ellis also won the Three-Point Shootout during the All-Star Weekend in Houston.

In the playoffs, the SuperSonics defeated the Houston Rockets in four games in the Western Conference First Round, before being swept by Magic Johnson, and the 2-time defending champion Los Angeles Lakers in four straight games in the Western Conference Semi-finals. The Lakers would reach the NBA Finals for the third consecutive year, but would lose to the Detroit Pistons in four straight games. Following the season, Lister was traded to the Golden State Warriors.

Draft picks

At the 1988 Draft, the SuperSonics got the fifteenth overall pick behind the Phoenix Suns. With their first round pick, the SuperSonics selected Gary Grant, but he would be traded on draft night along with a first-round pick to the Los Angeles Clippers for Michael Cage. In the third round, they selected guard Corey Gaines.

Roster

|-

Regular season

Season standings

z – clinched division title
y – clinched division title
x – clinched playoff spot

Record vs. opponents

Game log

|- align="center" bgcolor="#ccffcc"
|| 1 || November 4 || at Utah Jazz || 104–97 || Dale Ellis (46) || Salt Palace12,444 || 1–0
|- align="center" bgcolor="#ccffcc"
|| 2 || November 5 || Denver Nuggets || 142–141 (OT) || Xavier McDaniel (28) || Seattle Center Coliseum14,269 || 2–0
|- align="center" bgcolor="#ccffcc"
|| 3 || November 8 || at Sacramento Kings || 97–75 || Dale Ellis (28) || ARCO Arena (II)16,517 || 3–0
|- align="center" bgcolor="#ffcccc"
|| 4 || November 9 || Golden State Warriors || 108–113 || John Lucas (25) || Seattle Center ColiseumNot announced || 3–1
|- align="center" bgcolor="#ffcccc"
|| 5 || November 11 || at Los Angeles Lakers || 103–114 || Xavier McDaniel (20) || Great Western Forum17,505 || 3–2
|- align="center" bgcolor="#ffcccc"
|| 6 || November 12 || at Denver Nuggets || 129–141 || Dale Ellis (29) || McNichols Sports Arena12,401 || 3–3
|- align="center" bgcolor="#ccffcc"
|| 7 || November 17 || Los Angeles Lakers || 101–98 || Dale Ellis (27) || Seattle Center Coliseum14,576 || 4–3
|- align="center" bgcolor="#ffcccc"
|| 8 || November 19 || Dallas Mavericks || 106–112 || Xavier McDaniel (31) || Seattle Center Coliseum11,608 || 4–4
|- align="center" bgcolor="#ffcccc"
|| 9 || November 22 || Portland Trail Blazers || 104–125 || Dale Ellis (22) || Seattle Center Coliseum10,956 || 4–5
|- align="center" bgcolor="#ccffcc"
|| 10 || November 23 || at Golden State Warriors || 93–85 || Dale Ellis (36) || Oakland—Alameda County Coliseum Arena13,770 || 5–5
|- align="center" bgcolor="#ffcccc"
|| 11 || November 25 || at Phoenix Suns || 105–110 || Dale Ellis (28) || Arizona Veterans Memorial Coliseum10,710 || 5–6
|- align="center" bgcolor="#ccffcc"
|| 12 || November 29 || Utah Jazz || 109–102 || Dale Ellis (31) || Seattle Center Coliseum12,336 || 6–6
|- align="center" bgcolor="#ffcccc"
|| 13 || November 30 || at Los Angeles Lakers || 106–110 || Dale Ellis (36) || Great Western Forum17,505 || 6–7
|-

|- align="center" bgcolor="#ccffcc"
|| 14 || December 2 || Los Angeles Clippers || 154–104 || Dale EllisXavier McDaniel(27) || Seattle Center ColiseumNot announced || 7–7
|- align="center" bgcolor="#ccffcc"
|| 15 || December 3 || Golden State Warriors || 136–106 || Dale Ellis (36) || Seattle Center Coliseum10,571 || 8–7
|- align="center" bgcolor="#ccffcc"
|| 16 || December 6 || at San Antonio Spurs || 112–107 || Dale Ellis (28) || HemisFair ArenaNot announced || 9–7
|- align="center" bgcolor="#ffcccc"
|| 17 || December 7 || at Dallas Mavericks || 98–102 || Dale Ellis (26) || Reunion Arena17,007 || 9–8
|- align="center" bgcolor="#ffcccc"
|| 18 || December 10 || at Houston Rockets || 91–110 || Dale Ellis (26) || The Summit16,611 || 9–9
|- align="center" bgcolor="#ccffcc"
|| 19 || December 13 || Phoenix Suns || 126–116 || Dale Ellis (33) || Seattle Center Coliseum13,500 || 10–9
|- align="center" bgcolor="#ccffcc"
|| 20 || December 15 || San Antonio Spurs || 122–107 || Dale Ellis (28) || Seattle Center ColiseumNot announced || 11–9
|- align="center" bgcolor="#ccffcc"
|| 21 || December 17 || Sacramento Kings || 141–111 || Dale Ellis (27) || Seattle Center ColiseumNot announced || 12–9
|- align="center" bgcolor="#ffcccc"
|| 22 || December 20 || at Atlanta Hawks || 118–121 || Dale Ellis (30) || Omni Coliseum14,808 || 12–10
|- align="center" bgcolor="#ccffcc"
|| 23 || December 21 || at Miami Heat || 109–101 || Xavier McDaniel (23) || Miami Arena15,008 || 13–10
|- align="center" bgcolor="#ffcccc"
|| 24 || December 23 || at Cleveland Cavaliers || 107–119 (OT) || Dale Ellis (32) || Coliseum at Richfield15,857 || 13–11
|- align="center" bgcolor="#ffcccc"
|| 25 || December 27 || at Los Angeles Clippers || 100–104 || Dale Ellis (24) || Los Angeles Memorial Sports Arena11,505 || 13–12
|- align="center" bgcolor="#ccffcc"
|| 26 || December 29 || Miami Heat || 129–99 || Dale EllisXavier McDaniel(25) || Seattle Center Coliseum14,794 || 14–12
|-

|- align="center" bgcolor="#ccffcc"
|| 27 || January 3 || Los Angeles Lakers || 116–106 || Dale Ellis (42) || Seattle Center Coliseum14,645 || 15–12
|- align="center" bgcolor="#ccffcc"
|| 28 || January 5 || Sacramento Kings || 120–106 || Dale Ellis (49) || Seattle Center ColiseumNot announced || 16–12
|- align="center" bgcolor="#ccffcc"
|| 29 || January 7 || Portland Trail Blazers || 129–123 || Xavier McDaniel (29) || Seattle Center Coliseum14,726 || 17–12
|- align="center" bgcolor="#ccffcc"
|| 30 || January 9 || Cleveland Cavaliers || 105–103 || Derrick McKey (32) || Seattle Center Coliseum13,119 || 18–12
|- align="center" bgcolor="#ffcccc"
|| 31 || January 10 || at Portland Trail Blazers || 109–125 || Michael Cage (24) || Memorial Coliseum12,848 || 18–13
|- align="center" bgcolor="#ccffcc"
|| 32 || January 12 || Dallas Mavericks || 130–95 || Dale Ellis (36) || Seattle Center Coliseum14,290 || 19–13
|- align="center" bgcolor="#ccffcc"
|| 33 || January 14 || at Sacramento Kings || 102–93 || Dale Ellis (31) || ARCO Arena (II)16,517 || 20–13
|- align="center" bgcolor="#ffcccc"
|| 34 || January 16 || at Golden State Warriors || 117–146 || Dale Ellis (26) || Oakland—Alameda County Coliseum Arena12,340 || 20–14
|- align="center" bgcolor="#ccffcc"
|| 35 || January 17 || Los Angeles Clippers || 130–107 || Dale Ellis (28) || Seattle Center Coliseum11,402 || 21–14
|- align="center" bgcolor="#ccffcc"
|| 36 || January 19 || Houston Rockets || 124–108 || Xavier McDaniel (29) || Seattle Center Coliseum11,146 || 22–14
|- align="center" bgcolor="#ccffcc"
|| 37 || January 21 || New York Knicks || 121–119 || Xavier McDaniel (36) || Seattle Center Coliseum14,810 || 23–14
|- align="center" bgcolor="#ccffcc"
|| 38 || January 24 || at Portland Trail Blazers || 103–100 || Derrick McKey (34) || Memorial Coliseum12,848 || 24–14
|- align="center" bgcolor="#ccffcc"
|| 39 || January 27 || Atlanta Hawks || 119–112 || Derrick McKey (28) || Seattle Center Coliseum23,362 || 25–14
|- align="center" bgcolor="#ccffcc"
|| 40 || January 29 || Milwaukee Bucks || 112–106 || Derrick McKey (23) || Seattle Center Coliseum20,009 || 26–14
|- align="center" bgcolor="#ffcccc"
|| 41 || January 31 || New Jersey Nets || 112–118 || Dale Ellis (33) || Seattle Center ColiseumNot announced || 26–15
|-

|- align="center" bgcolor="#ccffcc"
|| 42 || February 2 || at Miami Heat || 100–93 || Dale Ellis (30) || Miami Arena14,798 || 27–15
|- align="center" bgcolor="#ffcccc"
|| 43 || February 3 || at Charlotte Hornets || 106–108 || Dale Ellis (27) || Charlotte Coliseum23,388 || 27–16
|- align="center" bgcolor="#ccffcc"
|| 44 || February 5 || at Boston Celtics || 89–87 || Dale Ellis (30) || Boston Garden14,890 || 28–16
|- align="center" bgcolor="#ffcccc"
|| 45 || February 7 || at New Jersey Nets || 99–109 || Dale Ellis (34) || Brendan Byrne ArenaNot announced || 28–17
|- align="center" bgcolor="#ffcccc"
|| 46 || February 8 || at Philadelphia 76ers || 102–109 || Dale Ellis (30) || The Spectrum11,224 || 28–18
|- align="center" bgcolor="#ccffcc"
|| 47 || February 14 || San Antonio Spurs || 129–113 || Xavier McDaniel (30) || Seattle Center Coliseum11,506 || 29–18
|- align="center" bgcolor="#ffcccc"
|| 48 || February 15 || at Phoenix Suns || 112–135 || Dale Ellis (21) || Arizona Veterans Memorial Coliseum12,800 || 29–19
|- align="center" bgcolor="#ccffcc"
|| 49 || February 17 || Washington Bullets || 126–112 || Derrick McKey (26) || Seattle Center Coliseum12,570 || 30–19
|- align="center" bgcolor="#ccffcc"
|| 50 || February 18 || at Portland Trail Blazers || 116–115 || Xavier McDaniel (37) || Memorial Coliseum12,848 || 31–19
|- align="center" bgcolor="#ccffcc"
|| 51 || February 21 || Boston Celtics || 96–91 || Dale Ellis (30) || Seattle Center Coliseum14,546 || 32–19
|- align="center" bgcolor="#ffcccc"
|| 52 || February 25 || Sacramento Kings || 94–97 || Xavier McDaniel (26) || Seattle Center Coliseum11,780 || 32–20
|- align="center" bgcolor="#ccffcc"
|| 53 || February 27 || at Sacramento Kings || 116–107 || Dale EllisDerrick McKey(27) || ARCO Arena (II)16,517 || 33–20
|- align="center" bgcolor="#ffcccc"
|| 54 || February 28 || Indiana Pacers || 106–108 || Dale Ellis (30) || Seattle Center ColiseumNot announced || 33–21
|-

|- align="center" bgcolor="#ccffcc"
|| 55 || March 3 || Houston Rockets || 118–108 || Dale Ellis (39) || Seattle Center Coliseum14,415 || 34–21
|- align="center" bgcolor="#ccffcc"
|| 56 || March 4 || Philadelphia 76ers || 118–104 || Xavier McDaniel (25) || Seattle Center Coliseum14,688 || 35–21
|- align="center" bgcolor="#ccffcc"
|| 57 || March 7 || at Indiana Pacers || 110–92 || Dale Ellis (27) || Market Square ArenaNot announced || 36–21
|- align="center" bgcolor="#ffcccc"
|| 58 || March 8 || at Detroit Pistons || 96–112 || Derrick McKey (21) || The Palace of Auburn Hills21,454 || 36–22
|- align="center" bgcolor="#ffcccc"
|| 59 || March 10 || at Milwaukee Bucks || 90–102 || Russ Schoene (18) || Bradley Center18,633 || 36–23
|- align="center" bgcolor="#ffcccc"
|| 60 || March 11 || at Chicago Bulls || 88–105 || Dale Ellis (26) || Chicago Stadium18,291 || 36–24
|- align="center" bgcolor="#ffcccc"
|| 61 || March 13 || at Washington Bullets || 101–106 || Dale Ellis (28) || Capital CentreNot announced || 36–25
|- align="center" bgcolor="#ffcccc"
|| 62 || March 14 || at New York Knicks || 110–116 || Xavier McDaniel (34) || Madison Square Garden (IV)18,759 || 36–26
|- align="center" bgcolor="bbffbbb"
|| 63 || March 16 || Charlotte Hornets || 108–88 || Dale Ellis (32) || Seattle Center ColiseumNot announced || 37–26
|- align="center" bgcolor="#ffcccc"
|| 64 || March 18 || at Phoenix Suns || 104–122 || Dale Ellis (29) || Arizona Veterans Memorial Coliseum14,471 || 37–27
|- align="center" bgcolor="#ccffcc"
|| 65 || March 21 || Utah Jazz || 101–96 || Dale Ellis (31) || Seattle Center Coliseum14,500 || 38–27
|- align="center" bgcolor="#ccffcc"
|| 66 || March 23 || Los Angeles Clippers || 115–112 || Dale Ellis (39) || Seattle Center Coliseum10,349 || 39–27
|- align="center" bgcolor="#ffcccc"
|| 67 || March 25 || Chicago Bulls || 110–111 || Dale Ellis (30) || Seattle Center Coliseum14,810 || 39–28
|- align="center" bgcolor="#ffcccc"
|| 68 || March 27 || at Utah Jazz || 105–124 || Dale EllisXavier McDaniel(16) || Salt Palace12,444 || 39–29
|- align="center" bgcolor="#ffcccc"
|| 69 || March 28 || at Houston Rockets || 117–120 || Dale Ellis (36) || The Summit16,611 || 39–30
|- align="center" bgcolor="#ffcccc"
|| 70 || March 30 || at Denver Nuggets || 116–123 || Dale Ellis (26) || McNichols Sports Arena14,851 || 39–31
|- align="center" bgcolor="#ffcccc"
|| 71 || March 31 || Detroit Pistons || 108–111 || Dale Ellis (30) || Seattle Center Coliseum14,810 || 39–32
|-

|- align="center" bgcolor="#ffcccc"
|| 72 || April 4 || Los Angeles Lakers || 97–115 || Dale EllisDerrick McKey(23) || Seattle Center Coliseum14,810 || 39–33
|- align="center" bgcolor="#ffcccc"
|| 73 || April 6 || Phoenix Suns || 119–126 || Xavier McDaniel (37) || Seattle Center Coliseum14,457 || 39–34
|- align="center" bgcolor="#ccffcc"
|| 74 || April 8 || at Dallas Mavericks || 114–90 || Dale Ellis (34) || Reunion Arena17,007 || 40–34
|- align="center" bgcolor="#ccffcc"
|| 75 || April 10 || at San Antonio Spurs || 102–89 || Dale Ellis (28) || HemisFair Arena12,448 || 41–34
|- align="center" bgcolor="#ccffcc"
|| 76 || April 13 || Miami Heat || 116–111 || Xavier McDaniel (35) || Seattle Center Coliseum11,267 || 42–34
|- align="center" bgcolor="#ccffcc"
|| 77 || April 15 || Denver Nuggets || 125–92 || Dale Ellis (32) || Seattle Center Coliseum14,250 || 43–34
|- align="center" bgcolor="#ccffcc"
|| 78 || April 17 || at Golden State Warriors || 116–109 (OT) || Derrick McKey (28) || Oakland—Alameda County Coliseum Arena15,025 || 44–34
|- align="center" bgcolor="#ccffcc"
|| 79 || April 18 || Golden State Warriors || 122–118 || Xavier McDanielDale Ellis(35) || Seattle Center Coliseum13,568 || 45–34
|- align="center" bgcolor="#ccffcc"
|| 80 || April 20 || Portland Trail Blazers || 124–118 || Dale EllisXavier McDaniel(31) || Seattle Center Coliseum14,320 || 46–34
|- align="center" bgcolor="#ccffcc"
|| 81 || April 21 || at Los Angeles Clippers || 139–136 (OT) || Xavier McDaniel (30) || Los Angeles Memorial Sports Arena11,280 || 47–34
|- align="center" bgcolor="#ffcccc"
|| 82 || April 23 || at Los Angeles Lakers || 117–121 || Xavier McDaniel (39) || Great Western Forum17,505 || 47–35
|-

 Green background indicates win.
 Red background indicates loss.

Playoffs

|- align="center" bgcolor="#ccffcc"
| 1
| April 28
| Houston
| W 111–107
| Dale Ellis (25)
| Xavier McDaniel (11)
| Nate McMillan (11)
| Seattle Kingdome14,250
| 1–0
|- align="center" bgcolor="#ccffcc"
| 2
| April 30
| Houston
| W 109–97
| McDaniel, Lister (20)
| Olden Polynice (10)
| Nate McMillan (8)
| Seattle Kingdome12,887
| 2–0
|- align="center" bgcolor="#ffcccc"
| 3
| May 3
| @ Houston
| L 107–126
| Dale Ellis (26)
| Michael Cage (10)
| Nate McMillan (10)
| The Summit16,611
| 2–1
|- align="center" bgcolor="#ccffcc"
| 4
| May 5
| @ Houston
| W 98–96
| Dale Ellis (26)
| Xavier McDaniel (10)
| Nate McMillan (10)
| The Summit16,611
| 3–1
|-

|- align="center" bgcolor="#ffcccc"
| 1
| May 7
| @ L.A. Lakers
| L 102–113
| Derrick McKey (23)
| Olden Polynice (10)
| Nate McMillan (12)
| Great Western Forum17,505
| 0–1
|- align="center" bgcolor="#ffcccc"
| 2
| May 10
| @ L.A. Lakers
| L 108–130
| Xavier McDaniel (17)
| Xavier McDaniel (8)
| Sedale Threatt (9)
| Great Western Forum17,505
| 0–2
|- align="center" bgcolor="#ffcccc"
| 3
| May 12
| L.A. Lakers
| L 86–91
| Dale Ellis (30)
| Xavier McDaniel (12)
| Sedale Threatt (9)
| Seattle Kingdome14,541
| 0–3
|- align="center" bgcolor="#ffcccc"
| 4
| May 14
| L.A. Lakers
| L 95–97
| Xavier McDaniel (30)
| Xavier McDaniel (11)
| Nate McMillan (8)
| Seattle Kingdome14,006
| 0–4
|-

Player statistics
Note: PG= per game; M= Minutes; R= Rebounds; A= Assists; S = Steals; B = Blocks; P = Points; T = Turnovers; PF = Personal fouls

Season

Playoffs

Awards and records
1989 NBA All-Star Game selections (game played on February 12, 1989)
 Dale Ellis

Non All-Star Awards and records
 Dale Ellis, All-NBA Third Team
 Dale Ellis, January 8 Player of the Week
 Xavier McDaniel, April 23 Player of the Week

Transactions

Free agents

Additions

Subtractions

Trades

Player Transactions Citation:

See also
 1988–89 NBA season

References

Seattle SuperSonics seasons